The Provident Life & Trust Company in Philadelphia, Pennsylvania, a demolished Victorian-era building by architect Frank Furness, is considered to have been one of his greatest works. A bank and insurance company founded in 1865 by members of the Society of Friends (Quakers), the Provident's L-shaped building had entrances at 407-09 Chestnut Street (bank) and 42 South 4th Street (insurance company). The two wings were eventually consolidated into an office building (also by Furness) at the northwest corner of 4th & Chestnut Streets.

Creation

In his Brazilian Pavilion at the 1876 Centennial Exposition, and his Centennial National Bank (1876) at 32nd St. & Lancaster Ave., Furness experimented with architectural features that would become part of his distinctive design vocabulary: unorthodox stone massing; revealing (and even highlighting) structure; compressed, piston-like columns; polychromy, all in a Moorish-influenced Modern Gothic style. The Provident Life & Trust Company was a major breakthrough for Furness, and remained vibrant even after later additions, interior and exterior, seriously compromised its power.

The bank at 407-09 Chestnut Street was to be part of Philadelphia's "Banker's Row", and the  challenge was to distinguish it from the established Italianate buildings. Furness won the Provident commission in a national design competition in 1876, besting his former partner George Hewitt. His forceful Modern Gothic facade demanded attention, its projecting bay and tower balanced on compressed columns, themselves supported by corbels (brackets) jutting out from the building. The whole was a study in tension and compressed energy, heavy, but not looming.

The interior was one enormous room, its 4-story walls and floor covered with multi-colored Minton tiles, an arched iron truss at mid-building decorated with machine-inspired cutouts, and skylights supported by iron trusses with similar cutouts. The front half was lit by the great Gothic window of the facade's projecting bay and a large skylight; the rear half, by another skylight and clerestory windows facing north. Rear windows from the insurance company on 4th Street opened into the tall light-filled banking room. The effect was more church-like than secular—a shrine to commerce—with a severity and logic that presaged the Chicago School of early-20th century modernism.

Expansion
Almost immediately, Furness's original vision was compromised as the company expanded. Within a couple years, a low, curved balcony was added at the rear, and another at the front beneath the great Gothic window, accessed by a spiral staircase to the banking floor and later from the building to the east. The bank was expanded north to Ranstead Street, the clerestory windows blocked, and a second balcony added at the rear. By 1888, the Provident had bought up all the adjacent properties to the east, and hired Furness, Evans & Company to build a 10-story office building.

Furness's Provident Building (1888–90) was a disappointment, a busy Bavarian fantasy attached to a model of creative rationalism. On its lower stories, he replicated the polychromatic materials of the bank and echoed the Gothic arch, but mostly the office building was ponderous and pretentious. Its steep, 3-story red-tile roof was matched by a new pyramidical roof for the bank's tower—a duncecap on what had been the brightest student. The office building's 1945 demolition (and the removal of the duncecap) enabled architects to look at the original bank anew.

Demolition
Across Chestnut Street from the Furness bank was the Second Bank of the United States (1819–24), a white-marble, Greek Revival temple by William Strickland. Planning for what is now Independence National Historical Park (INHP) began in the late-1940s, and Strickland's bank was to become an art museum housing portraits of the Founding Fathers. On the block opposite Furness's bank, every building except the Second Bank was demolished for the national park, and a re-creation of William Thornton's Library Company of Philadelphia (1790) was erected. The sedate Italianate buildings of Banker's Row were considered harmonious with the Second Bank and the re-created Library Hall; the Provident was considered jarring.

Through the 1950s, architectural historians worked to save Furness's bank, writing articles for major publications, photographing and documenting it. Charles E. Peterson, the National Park Service architect assigned to INHP, edited a column in the Journal of the Society of Architectural Historians and used it to call attention to the Provident. But, in the end, the Colonial Revivalists remained unswayed, and Furness's bank was demolished beginning in 1959. Samples of the Minton tiles and other architectural elements are preserved in the architecture study collection at INHP.

In essence, the brash, Look-At-Me!-quality that had won Furness the Provident commission was the very reason for the building's demolition. Architectural historian Henry-Russell Hitchcock eulogized it in 1963:

"Still more original and impressive were his banks, even though they lay quite off the main line of development of commercial architecture in this period. The most extraordinary of these, and Furness's masterpiece, was the Provident Institution in Walnut  [sic. Chestnut]  Street, built as late as 1879. This was most unfortunately demolished in the Philadelphia urban renewal campaign several years ago, but the gigantic and forceful scale of the granite membering alone should have justified its respectful preservation. The interior, entirely lined with patterned tiles, was of rather later character than the facade and eventually much cluttered with later intrusions, but it was equally fine in its own way originally."

Notes

References

External links
 Provident Mutual Life Insurance Company of Philadelphia records at Hagley Museum and Library

Commercial buildings completed in 1879
Buildings and structures in Philadelphia
Financial services companies of the United States
Frank Furness buildings
Demolished buildings and structures in Philadelphia
Buildings and structures demolished in 1959